Ingibjörg Jónsdóttir (born 24 October 1993) is an Icelandic swimmer. She competed in the women's 50 metre backstroke event at the 2017 World Aquatics Championships. She also competed in the women's 50 metre freestyle event at the 2018 FINA World Swimming Championships (25 m), in Hangzhou, China.

References

External links
 

1993 births
Living people
Icelandic female freestyle swimmers
Place of birth missing (living people)
Icelandic female backstroke swimmers